Puchała or Puchala is a Polish surname. It may refer to:

 Józef Achilles Puchała (1911–1943), Polish Franciscan friar
 Linda Puchala, American government official

See also
 

Polish-language surnames